Sakharam Hari Gupte (19 September 1718- October 1779) was born in Chandraseniya Kayastha Prabhu (CKP) family, and was the commander and tipnis (secretary) of Peshwa Bajirao I. For few years he worked under Peshwa Nanasaheb and then became the General of Raghunathrao Peshwa. He was responsible for conquering Attock on the banks of the Indus and repelling the Durrani ruler, Ahmad Shah Abdali out of India in the 1750s.

Campaigns with Peshwa Bajirao I 

At the age of 17 years, Sakharam Hari Gupte joined the army of Peshwa Bajirao I alongside his brother Baburao Gupte. In 1735, when he joined the Peshwa's army, during the battle against "Siddhi Rahiman"; Sakharam Hari stood across him and killed him on the spot. As a felicitation gesture, Bajirao I gave him the same elephant used by Siddhi Rahiman and also made him the commander of a cavalry of 1200 horsemen. 

During a crucial battle (1737-1738) between Peshwa Bajirao I and Nizam-ul-Mulk  when the marathas found themselves in the lost position. Sakharam Hari Gupte faked a retreat and then surrounded a hill that was empty from both sides. He then attacked from there resulting in victory for the Peshwa and maratha army. Peshwa Bajirao I made him his tipnis (secretary) and till the time of his death, he assigned him various tasks to be fulfilled at Ajinkyatara.

Rise to Power 

During the reign of Peshwa Bajirao I, Sakharam Hari Gupte enjoyed respect at Chhatrapati Shahu's Ajinkyatara fort. Sakharam Hari Gupte was married to Avabai Kohlatkar who was the elder sister of Parvatibai Kolhatkar. Sakharam Hari Gupte had become very close to both Peshwa Bajirao's family namely to Chimaji Appasaheb and Nanasaheb as well as Chhatrapati Shahu. He had become a trusted name in the maratha royal circles. Once when a 3 year old Parvatibai accompanied him to Chhatrapati Shahu's court, the Maratha ruler was impressed by her sharp intellect and enthusiasm. He adopted the young Parvatibai and decided to train her in administration and warfare. The maratha ruler also suggested Parvatibai's proposal for Chimaji Appasaheb's 7 year old son, Sadashivrao. Since, everyone was impressed by Parvatibai and Sakharam Hari Gupte, a man was sent to the latter's household in Nashik to seek the girl's hand. But the man reported back to Chimaji Appa that the girl was too talkative. Also, the alliance couldn't take place as the Chhatrapati Shahu I wanted someone to finance the next mohim (campaign) so he got Sadashivrao married to Umabai Mehendale who was affluent.  

After, Umabai's death Sadashivrao was married to Parvatibai, likewise, Chhatrapati Shahu I who had a secular approach fixed Radhikabai's marriage to Vishwasrao 

On gudi padwa day, Vishwasrao (8 years old) and Radhikabai (4 years old) were engaged to each other.

Fall from Power 

After the death of Peshwa Madhavrao I, Nana Fadnavis and Gopikabai gained more power with the rise of next Peshwa, Narayanrao. Gopikabai and Nana Fadnavis instructed Narayanrao to lay restrictions on the CKP caste. Narayanrao, also insulted Sardar Gupte who had gone to his court on behalf of the Prabhu caste to void the restrictions. Later, Tuloji Pawar, Sakharam Bapu Bokil and Raghunathrao hatched the plot to kill Narayanrao. Sardar Gupte was also accused of the same.

Few months after the death of Narayanrao, Nana Fadnavis offered Sakharam Bapu Bokil to join the Barbai financial council. He accepted the offer. But restrictions on Sardar Gupte and his family as well as the prabhus of Pen were continued. After, Gopikabai's death in Nashik, Sardar Gupte was arrested by deception.

His daughter and son were also arrested, exact time is not known. They were put in Dhangad fort's dungeon in Ahmednagar. Fourteen months, Sardar Gupte was kept in the arrest and a sum of Rs.12000 along with jewellery were collected from his wife Avaibai Gupte. His daughter and son were then released but Sardar Gupte was not released despite of the agreement done with Avaibai.

References

https://shodhganga.inflibnet.ac.in/bitstream/10603/140659/8/08_chapter%202.pdf

http://weeklyamber.com/index.php/amber-prasangik-lekh/14071-2017-06-20-10-54-35

Military history of India
Indian military leaders
People of the Maratha Empire
Marathi people
People from Maharashtra
18th-century Indian people
1735 births
1779 deaths